Phenomena is a rock music concept formed by record producer Tom Galley and his brother, Whitesnake guitarist Mel Galley. During the recording of Phenomena I, they were joined by Metalhammer founder Wilfried Rimensberger. Contributors were leading rock musicians such as Glenn Hughes, Brian May, and John Wetton, amongst others.

History 
In a cover story run by Kerrang! magazine in 1985, Phenomena's production of rock songs based on a story line running through a whole album, attached to artworks and other multi-media aspects, was credited for the "return of the concept album" in the 1980s. Phenomena released three albums in the 1980s and early 1990s, and had a number one hit single in South America with "Did It All for Love", while the album charted in Europe, Japan, and Brazil. It was after working together on the second album, that Kyoji Yamamoto invited Neil Murray to join Vow Wow.

In 1993, Tom Galley sold his rights to the recordings and the brand concept to former Wishbone Ash member Merv Spence of Parachute Music Ltd, releasing Phenomena 3, under the name Inner Vision. In 2017, the rights to the recordings of the Phenomena trilogy of albums were obtained by Daniel Earnshaw of Explore Rights Management Ltd.

Discography

Singles 
"Phenomena II Did It All for Love" (BMG/RCA, 1987)

Albums 
Phenomena (Bronze, 1985) – UK #63
Phenomena II: Dream Runner (BMG/RCA, 1987)
Phenomena III: Inner Vision (Parachute Music, 1993)
Psycho Fantasy (Escape Music, 2006)
Blind Faith (Escape Music, 2010)
Awakening (Escape Music, 2012)

Compilation albums 
Phenomena Project X 1985–1996 (1997) (Creative World Entertainment)
The Complete Works (2006 CWE) (first three albums partly remixed, plus bonus tracks, but omitting three tracks inadvertently)
Phenomena Anthology (2019) (Explore Rights Management Ltd)

References

External links 
Official website

English rock music groups
Musical groups established in 1984